Luca Javier Andrada (born 22 April 2001) is an Argentine professional footballer who plays as a midfielder for Greek Super League 2 club AEL, on loan from Racing Club.

Professional career
Andrade joined the youth academy of Racing Club at the age of 7. On 19 January 2020, Andrada signed his first professional contract with Racing Club. Andrada made his professional debut with Racing Club in a 1-1 Argentine Primera División tie with Defensa y Justicia on 20 November 2019. In January 2022, Andrada joined Estudiantes de Buenos Aires on a one-year loan deal.

References

External links
 

2001 births
Living people
Sportspeople from Lanús
Argentine footballers
Argentine expatriate footballers
Association football midfielders
Racing Club de Avellaneda footballers
Estudiantes de Buenos Aires footballers
Athlitiki Enosi Larissa F.C. players
Argentine Primera División players
Primera Nacional players
Super League Greece 2 players
Argentine expatriate sportspeople in Greece
Expatriate footballers in Greece